Timothy G. Dugan (born October 9, 1953) is an American judge on the Wisconsin Court of Appeals in the Milwaukee-based District I, serving since his appointment in 2016.  Prior to the Court of Appeals, he served 13 years as a Wisconsin Circuit Court Judge in Milwaukee County.

Biography

Born in Milford, Connecticut, Dugan graduated from Westminster College in Utah in 1975. He then received his Juris Doctor degree from Marquette University Law School in 1978. He lived in Shorewood, Wisconsin. In 1992, Dugan was appointed to the Wisconsin Circuit Court in Milwaukee County by Governor Tommy Thompson. He was re-elected to the Circuit Court without opposition in 1993, 1999, 2005, and 2011.

During his judicial career, Judge Dugan has been President of the Milwaukee Trial Judges Association and served as the Associate Dean of the Wisconsin Judicial College.  In 2008, Judge Dugan was nominated by President George W. Bush to the United States District Court for the Eastern District of Wisconsin to replace retiring Judge Rudolph T. Randa, but Judge Randa chose to rescind his resignation.

In 2015, Dugan was a finalist under consideration by Governor Scott Walker for appointment to the Wisconsin Court of Appeals after Judge Rebecca Bradley's elevation to the Wisconsin Supreme Court; that seat instead went to William W. Brash III.  Governor Walker ultimately appointed Judge Dugan to the Court of Appeals in October 2016 to replace retiring Judge Patricia S. Curley.  He was re-elected without opposition in 2018.

Electoral history

Wisconsin Circuit Court (1993, 1999, 2005, 2011)

| colspan="6" style="text-align:center;background-color: #e9e9e9;"| General Election, April 6, 1993

| colspan="6" style="text-align:center;background-color: #e9e9e9;"| General Election, April 6, 1999

| colspan="6" style="text-align:center;background-color: #e9e9e9;"| General Election, April 5, 2005

| colspan="6" style="text-align:center;background-color: #e9e9e9;"| General Election, April 5, 2011

Wisconsin Court of Appeals (2018)

| colspan="6" style="text-align:center;background-color: #e9e9e9;"| General Election, April 3, 2018

References

1953 births
Living people
People from Milford, Connecticut
People from Shorewood, Wisconsin
Marquette University Law School alumni
Westminster College (Utah) alumni
Wisconsin state court judges
Wisconsin Court of Appeals judges
21st-century American judges